Hakea longiflora is a small shrub in the family  Proteaceae and is endemic  to Western Australia. It has sharp, short, needle-like leaves with white flowers and a prominent red style.

Description
It blooms from June to September and produces yellow flowers. Each simple inflorescence is composed of two flowers at different stages of development.

Taxonomy
The species was first formally described by the botanist Robyn Mary Barker in 1990 as part of the work New species, new combinations and other name changes in Hakea (Proteaceae) as published in the Journal of the Adelaide Botanic Gardens. The only synonym is Hakea erinacea var. longiflora as described by George Bentham in 1870.

The specific epithet is said to be derived from the Latin words longus meaning long and florus meaning "flower", referring to the long flowers of this plant compared to Hakea erinacea which Bentham thought this species was a variety of. The proper word for "flower" in classical and botanical Latin is however flos.

Distribution
It is endemic to an area between Dandaragan and Coorow in the Wheatbelt region of Western Australia where it is found in and among breakaways growing in sandy-loamy-gravelly soils. It is usually in low open heath land communities often over sandstone. Although the species has a small range it is quite common within the area.

References

longiflora
Eudicots of Western Australia
Plants described in 1990